The St. William's Church also alternatively called Catholic Church of St. William is a religious building that is affiliated with the Catholic Church and is located on the island of Tortola in the Main Street of the village of Road Town capital of the British Virgin Islands, a territory of the United Kingdom in the Lesser Antilles.

Although the community was founded in 1957 with a small chapel it was completed in 1993 and the first church much larger current building dates from 1999 and included the construction of a parish hall and administrative offices. Follow the Roman or Latin rite and depends on the Diocese of Saint John's - Basseterre. Most Masses are held in English with one in Spanish on Saturdays.

See also
Holy Family Cathedral (St. John's)

References

Roman Catholic churches in the British Virgin Islands
Saint William
Roman Catholic churches completed in 1999
1957 establishments in the British Empire
20th-century Roman Catholic church buildings in the United Kingdom